Moieciu is a commune in Brașov County, Transylvania, Romania. It is located 29 km south of Brașov, within the Bran Pass.

The commune is composed of six villages: Cheia (Kheja), Drumul Carului, Măgura (Magura), Moieciu de Jos (the commune center), Moieciu de Sus (Felsőmoécs) and Peștera (Pestera). Măgura and Peștera are on the eastern side of the Piatra Craiului Mountains.

References

External links

 Official site
 Moeciu - Romania - Information about Moeciu resort

Communes in Brașov County
Localities in Transylvania